Taeniamia is a genus of cardinalfishes native to the Indian Ocean and the western Pacific Ocean.

Species
The 15 recognized species in this genus are:
 Taeniamia ataenia (J. E. Randall & Satapoomin, 1999) (barless cardinalfish)
 Taeniamia biguttata (Lachner, 1951) (twinspot cardinalfish)
 Taeniamia bilineata (Gon & J. E. Randall, 1995)
 Taeniamia buruensis (Bleeker, 1856) (Buru cardinalfish)
 Taeniamia flavofasciata (Gon & J. E. Randall, 2003)
 Taeniamia fucata (Cantor, 1849) (orange-lined cardinalfish)
 Taeniamia kagoshimanus (Döderlein (de), 1883) 
 Taeniamia leai (Waite, 1916) (Lea's cardinalfish)
 Taeniamia lineolata (G. Cuvier, 1828) (shimmering cardinal)
 Taeniamia macroptera (G. Cuvier, 1828) (dusky-tailed cardinalfish)
 Taeniamia melasma (Lachner & W. R. Taylor, 1960) (blackspot cardinalfish)
 Taeniamia mozambiquensis (J. L. B. Smith, 1961) (Mozambique cardinalfish)
 Taeniamia pallida (Gon & J. E. Randall, 1995)
 Taeniamia sansibaricus (Pfeffer, 1896) 
 Taeniamia zosterophora (Bleeker, 1856) (girdled cardinalfish or blackbelted cardinalfish)
FishBase treats T. sansibaricus as synonymous with T. fucata. but T. sansibaricus is recognized as valid by the Catalog of Fishes:

References

 
Apogoninae
Marine fish genera
Taxa named by Thomas H. Fraser